Birinji Nugadi Village Mosque is a 19th century mosque located in Birinji Nugadi village of Guba region of the Republic of Azerbaijan.

About 

Birinji Nugadi village mosque was built by the villagers in the early 19th century. The mosque is built of raw bricks, and the minaret is made of red brick at a height of 15 m. The minaret was built about 10-13 years before the mosque. At first, the minaret was built at the same time as the mosque. However, the mosque was later found to be small, and it was demolished and replaced by the current mosque.

After the Soviet occupation in 1930, the mosque was used as a movie club, gym and warehouse. The surrounding cells were given to the kindergarten. During its operation as a warehouse, the wooden floors of the mosque were demolished and replaced with surface stones. The roof of the mosque was repaired in 1986 due to erosion. The roof was replaced and the external facades were renewed. However, the inside has not been repaired. After Azerbaijan gained independence, the mosque was restored. However, the mosque is currently in a state of emergency.

The mosque's religious community is registered with the State Committee.

Gallery

See also
 Taza Pir Mosque
 Muhammad Mosque
 Bibi-Heybat Mosque

References

Mosques in Azerbaijan
Quba District (Azerbaijan)